Óscar Cantón Zetina (born 1 August 1953) is a Mexican politician affiliated with the Party of the Democratic Revolution (previously to the Institutional Revolutionary Party). As of 2014 he served as Senator of the LIV, LV, LVIII and LIX Legislatures of the Mexican Congress representing Tabasco and as Deputy of the LII Legislature.

References

1953 births
Living people
Politicians from Tabasco
National Autonomous University of Mexico alumni
Members of the Senate of the Republic (Mexico)
Members of the Chamber of Deputies (Mexico)
Presidents of the Chamber of Deputies (Mexico)
Institutional Revolutionary Party politicians
Party of the Democratic Revolution politicians
21st-century Mexican politicians
20th-century Mexican politicians